Tarik Azzougarh (born January 29, 1979), better known as his stage name Cilvaringz, is a Dutch-Moroccan record producer, rapper, and artist manager from Tilburg, North Brabant. He is associated with the Wu-Tang Clan and is best known for conceptualizing and producing the world's most expensive work of music, Wu-Tang Clan's Once Upon a Time in Shaolin.

Cilvaringz was discovered by Ol' Dirty Bastard and Method Man at a Wu-Tang Clan concert in Amsterdam, Netherlands, on May 26, 1997. After impressing ODB with a live freestyle on stage he was introduced to RZA who signed him to Wu-Tang Records in 1999, becoming the first non-American affiliate of the Wu-Tang Clan.

Between 2002 and 2010 Cilvaringz toured the world as the official opening act of RZA, Method Man & Redman, Raekwon and Ghostface Killah. On April 9, 2007, he released his first solo album I through five different record labels around the world, receiving critical acclaim for its return to the original Wu-Tang sound.

In April 2008 Cilvaringz conceptualized and began producing Wu-Tang Clan's secret album Once Upon a Time in Shaolin under the patronage of RZA. The unique release of the secret album as only one available copy in the world became one of the biggest and widely covered music stories of 2014. Forbes magazine broke the story exclusively on March 26, 2014. On May 3, 2015, the album sold for a reported US$2 million to pharmaceutical entrepreneur Martin Shkreli, making it the most expensive musical work ever sold. In July 2021, the album broke its own record as the most expensive work of music ever sold and most expensive music related NFT when the US Department of Justice sold it to non-fungible token collectors PleasrDAO for $4 million to cover Shkreli's debts; PleasrDAO said they hoped to make it more widely accessible.

Early life
Cilvaringz was born in Dordrecht, Holland and grew up in the city of Tilburg.

Discovery by Wu-Tang Clan
On May 26, 1997, the Wu-Tang Clan performed at the Melkweg in Amsterdam as part of the Wu-Tang Forever promo tour. As the concert came to an end Wu-Tang Clan members Ol' Dirty Bastard and Method Man announced a freestyle session for local talent. Cilvaringz rushed to the stage but could not reach it due to the excitement of many fans. Ol' Dirty Bastard spotted Cilvaringz struggling from the side and pulled him up on stage, giving him his microphone. Capturing the attention of the entire group and crowd with his freestyle, he was pulled to the side by Method Man and Ol' Dirty Bastard and then introduced to RZA who was watching the freestyle from the side of the stage. When a fight broke out between the Wu-Tang Clan and a group of fans whose girlfriends were getting undressed by Ol' Dirty Bastard on stage, security rushed in and cleared the podium, throwing Cilvaringz back into the crowd. Not knowing how to get backstage Cilvaringz lost contact with RZA. According to Cilvaringz, RZA had just told him that he was interested in signing him to Wu-Tang Clan's extended group the Wu-Tang Killa Beez.

RPEG Ltd 
In 2002, Cilvaringz launched his entertainment company RPEG Ltd which organized tours and booked live performances for various artists.

In 2006, RPEG Ltd expanded its services into management and guided the careers of Arab rappers Salah Edin, Eslam Jawaad, Ledr P from Sweden, Moroccan producer DJ Van and American producer Focus..., the son of Chic bassist Bernard Edwards who at the time was the only producer signed to Dr. Dre's imprint Aftermath Entertainment. In managing their careers, RPEG Ltd collaborated with De La Soul, Damon Albarn, Gorillaz, IAM, Sefyu, Mala Rodriguez and others.

In 2007, RPEG Ltd served as the executive producer for Salah Edin's debut album Nederlands Grootste Nachtmerrie which became the most controversial album in the history of Dutch Hip Hop music, also winning the Best Dutch Album Award. Later that year, Jive/Epic France and RPEG Ltd collaborated on the production of French artist La Fouine's second album Aller-Retour. Focus produced the majority of the album which reached Gold status in France. RPEG Ltd closed the year with a Cilvaringz and Ghostface Killah collaboration on a theme song for the Irish cartoon Skunk Fu.

In 2008, RPEG Ltd and lawyer Margriet Koedooder sued Dutch politician Geert Wilders for wrongfully portraying the image of the artist Salah Edin in the controversial anti-Islam movie Fitna. The court ruled in favor of Salah Edin and awarded 10.000 euros in copyright infringement and defamation damages. It was the first time Wilders lost a lawsuit.

In 2010, RPEG Ltd teamed up with Universal Music Spain for the production of Mala Rodriguez's fourth studio album Dirty Bailarina. Focus was enlisted to produce the majority of the album. Dirty Bailarina won two Latin Grammy Awards for Best Urban Music Album and Best Urban Song.

In 2011, RPEG ltd ceased all management and touring services to focus on the production of Wu-Tang Clan's secret single copy album Once Upon a Time in Shaolin.

In 2016, RPEG Ltd took on management for Moroccan artist Manal, negotiating her contract with Sony Music Middle East.

Once Upon A Time In Shaolin 
In 2014, Cilvaringz and RZA announced the release of Once Upon a Time in Shaolin, a Wu-Tang Clan album that was recorded in secret over a period of six years and of which only one single copy exists. Cilvaringz, who developed the idea of the Renaissance approach to music as a commissioned commodity further developed the concept with RZA into a presentable concept to the public, receiving additional advice from prominent art world figures along the way. On March 26, 2014 Forbes magazine exclusively announced the unique release of the album. The article reached a million views and spread throughout prominent media outlets across the world.

On May 3, 2015, the album sold to controversial pharmaceutical entrepreneur Martin Shkreli for a reported two million dollars, making it the most expensive musical work ever sold in the history of music. Martin Shkreli's identity as the buyer was kept secret until Bloomberg News revealed his identity in November 2016. When Martin Shkreli was arrested for securities fraud allegations a few weeks later the FBI was prompted to tweet about the album's fate. It became the FBI's most liked and most retweeted tweet.

Film 
Cilvaringz played a small role in the movie Shouf Shouf Habibi. He also appeared in the theme song of the movie.

Personal life 
Cilvaringz moved to Marrakech, Morocco in 2007 and lives in the city's outskirts with his wife and two daughters. He is a practicing Muslim but does not follow any particular ideology within Islam.

Discography

Studio albums

Instrumental Albums

Singles

Executive Produced Albums

Executive Produced Singles

Videography

References

Living people
Dutch rappers
Moroccan rappers
Wu-Tang Clan affiliates
Dutch people of Moroccan descent
Dutch Muslims
1979 births
20th-century Dutch people
21st-century Dutch people
People from Dordrecht
Musicians from South Holland